Nocardioides aromaticivorans is a gram-positive non-motile bacterium from the genus Nocardioides that has been isolated from a river contaminated with dioxin in Kanagawa, Japan. Nocardioides aromaticivorans has the ability to degrade dibenzofuran and carbazole.

References

Further reading

External links
Type strain of Nocardioides aromaticivorans at BacDive -  the Bacterial Diversity Metadatabase

aromaticivorans
Bacteria described in 2005